Josh Lee Holloway (born July 20, 1969) is an American actor best known for his roles as James "Sawyer" Ford on the television show Lost and as Will Bowman on the science fiction drama Colony. Most recently he had a recurring role in season 3 of the western series Yellowstone.

Early life 
Holloway was born in San Jose, California, the second of four boys of a nurse mother and a surveyor father. His family moved to the Blue Ridge Mountains of Georgia when he was two. He was raised in Free Home, Georgia. Holloway is related to Baptist preacher Dr. Dale Holloway, and author and World War II prisoner of war Carl Holloway. He is also a descendant of Robert E. Lee. Holloway attended Cherokee High School in Canton, Georgia, graduating in 1987. He developed an interest in movies at a very young age. He studied at the University of Georgia but left after one quarter due to financial constraints.

Career 

Holloway moved to Los Angeles, where he began a successful career as a runway and print model, including for brands Dolce & Gabbana, Calvin Klein and Donna Karan. In 1993, Holloway appeared in the Aerosmith video for the song "Cryin'" as a thief who tries to steal Alicia Silverstone's purse from a diner, only to be caught and beaten up by her.

Holloway eventually started acting. His first role was as "Good Looking Guy" in an episode of Angel in 1999, followed by a role in the comedy Doctor Benny and in the movies Mi Amigo, Moving August, and Cold Heart. Following these roles, he gained recognition for his lead role in the Sci-Fi Channel movie Sabretooth with David Keith and John Rhys-Davies. He also made appearances in Good Girls Don't episode "Addicted To Love"; NCIS episode "My Other Left Foot"; The Lyon's Den episode "Separation Anxiety"; Walker, Texas Ranger episode "Medieval Crimes"; and CSI: Crime Scene Investigation episode "Assume Nothing".His big break came when he was cast as James "Sawyer" Ford in the hit television series Lost. The show propelled Holloway to celebrity status, but left him with little time to leverage his fame with other roles. According to USA Today, he took himself out of consideration for a role in a Brad Pitt Western due to the demands of his filming schedule. Nevertheless, he found time to star in the thriller Whisper and he also ventured into the world of video games in Command & Conquer 3: Tiberium Wars. In the game, he plays the role of a Brotherhood of Nod intelligence officer named Ajay whose primary role is to assist players by supplying information that is crucial to upcoming battles. In May 2007, 20th Century Fox approached Holloway for the second time and offered him the role of Gambit in X-Men 4. In 2005, People magazine named Holloway one of the "50 Most Beautiful People in the World". In January 2006, In Touch Weekly named Holloway the "hottest hunk" on television. In the same month, Holloway was voted the seventeenth-sexiest guy worldwide by British readers of OK! magazine. In the same year, he was voted the second-sexiest star in Hollywood by Us Weekly.

In March 2007, Holloway was selected as the new face for Davidoff's fragrance Cool Water worldwide. In Spring 2008, Holloway was selected as the first male spokesperson for Magnum ice cream of Turkey. Previous Magnum spokespersons include Eva Longoria and Elizabeth Hurley. In the same year he made the top ten list of TV Guides Sexiest Stars.

Holloway appeared in the 2009 film Stay Cool, a comedy written by the Polish brothers. Artist Salvador Larroca is believed by Comic Book Resources columnist Timothy Callahan to have used Holloway as the model for his rendition of Tony Stark during his run on Iron Man, which began in 2008. In June 2010, Holloway won a Saturn Award for "Best Actor on Television" for his role on Lost. In September 2010, Holloway was added to the cast of Mission: Impossible – Ghost Protocol, which was released in December 2011. In 2014, Holloway starred in the lead role in the CBS television show Intelligence as a cybercrime agent who can "access the entire electromagnetic spectrum" with his mind.

In 2016, Holloway began starring in Colony as Will Bowman, a former FBI agent who, in a bid to protect his family, is forced to collaborate with the occupational government to bring down the growing resistance movement inside the L.A. colony in the near future. Colony marked a Lost reunion for Holloway and executive producer Carlton Cuse.

Personal life 
At the end of shooting the Lost pilot in Oahu, Hawaii, Holloway proposed to his long-time girlfriend, Yessica Kumala. The couple married on October 1, 2004. They now have two children, Java and Hunter Holloway.

Filmography

Film

Television

Music videos and games

Awards and nominations

References

External links 

1969 births
Male actors from Georgia (U.S. state)
American male film actors
Male models from Georgia (U.S. state)
American male television actors
Living people
People from Cherokee County, Georgia
University of Georgia alumni
20th-century American male actors
21st-century American male actors
People from Canton, Georgia